The position of Dean of Ely Cathedral, in East Anglia, England, in the Diocese of Ely  was created in 1541 after the Dissolution of the Monasteries. The first Dean of Ely had been the last Benedictine prior of Ely.

List of deans

Early modern
1541–1557 Robert Steward (last prior)
1557–1589 Andrew Perne
1589–1591 John Bell
1591–1614 Humphrey Tyndall
1614–1636 Henry Caesar or Adelmare
1636–1646 William Fuller
1646–1651 William Beale
1660–1661 Richard Love
1661–1662 Henry Ferne
1662 Edward Martin
1662–1667 Francis Wilford
1667–1677 Robert Mapletoft
1677–1693 John Spencer
1693–1708 John Lambe
1708–1712 Charles Roderick
1713–1729 Robert Moss
1729–1730 John Frankland
1730–1758 Peter Allix

1758–1780 Hugh Thomas
1780–1797 William Cooke

Late modern
1797–1820 William Pearce
1820–1839 James Wood
1839–1858 George Peacock
1858–1869 Harvey Goodwin (afterwards Bishop of Carlisle, 1869)
1869–1893 Charles Merivale
1893–1905 Charles Stubbs
1905–1936 Alexander Kirkpatrick
1936–1950 Lionel Blackburne
1951–1969 Patrick Hankey
1969–1982 Michael Carey
1982–1984 Allan Shaw
1984–1990 William (Bill) Patterson
1991–2003 Michael Higgins
2003–2011 Michael Chandler
2012–2012 Canon David Pritchard  (Acting)
2012–present Mark Bonney

Fictional to deans
 Pennyfather, in Agatha Christie's At Bertram's Hotel.

References

Sources
British History – Fasti Ecclesiae Anglicanae 1541-1857, Vol. 7 – Deans of Ely

 
Lists of English people